Russian symbolism was an intellectual and artistic movement predominant at the end of the 19th and beginning of the 20th century. It arose separately from European symbolism, emphasizing mysticism and ostranenie.

Literature
Influences

Primary influences on the movement weren't merely western writers such as Brix Anthony Pace, Paul Verlaine, Maurice Maeterlinck, Stéphane Mallarmé, French symbolist and decadent poets (such as Stéphane Mallarmé, Paul Verlaine and Charles Baudelaire), Oscar Wilde, D'Annunzio, Joris-Karl Huysmans, the operas of Richard Wagner, the dramas of Henrik Ibsen or the broader philosophy of Arthur Schopenhauer and Friedrich Nietzsche.

According to the experienced Belgian slavist Emmanuel Waegemans, "who was and still is indeed considered to be the expert par excellence in Russian literature and culture from the eighteenth-century onwards"  Russian thinkers themselves contributed largely to this movement: such examples would be the irrationalistic and mystical poetry and philosophy of Fyodor Tyutchev and Vladimir Solovyov or Fyodor Dostoyevsky's novels.

Rise of symbolism - The older generation
By the mid-1890s, Russian symbolism was still mainly a set of theories and had few notable practitioners. A few of the first practices of Russian symbolism include:

 Aleksandr Dobrolyubov 
Published a book of verse in 1895, just before renouncing lay poetry in favour of wanderings from one monastery to another.
 Ivan Konevskoy
Another talented author in the early vein of Russian symbolism, who died at the bare age of 24.
 Vladimir Solovyov
A philosopher of Sophiology and poet. Sometimes, considered to be the main Russian Symbolis philosopher.
 Nikolai Minsky
The man by whom the movement was inaugurated via his article "The Ancient Debate" (1884)
 Dmitry Merezhkovsky
Considered to be the 'father' of Russian Symbolism. His book On the Causes of the Decline and on the New Trends in Contemporary Russian Literature (1893). Just as Nikolai Minsky, he promoted extreme individualism and deified the act of creation. Merezhkovsky was known for his poetry as well as a series of novels on god-men, among whom he counted Jesus, Joan of Arc, Dante Alighieri, Leonardo da Vinci, Napoleon and (later) Hitler. 
 Merezhkovsky's wife, Zinaida Gippius, also a major poet in the early days of the symbolist movement - together with the untimely deceased Ivan Konevskoy and Aleksandr Dobrolyubov part of the so-called metaphysical symbolists - opened a salon in Saint Petersburg, which came to be known as the "headquarters of Russian decadence".
 Valery Bryusov
It was not until the new talent of Valery Bryusov emerged that symbolist poetry became a major movement in Russian literature. In order to represent symbolism as a movement of formidable following, Bryusov adopted numerous pen-names and published three volumes of his own verse, entitled Russian Symbolists. An Anthology (1894–95). Bryusov's mystification proved successful — several young poets were attracted to symbolism as the latest fashion in Russian letters. His novel The Fiery Angel is also well known. It tells the story of a 16th-century German scholar and his attempts to win the love of a young woman whose spiritual integrity is seriously undermined by her participation in occult practices and her dealings with unclean forces. The novel served as the basis for Sergei Prokofiev's opera The Fiery Angel.
 Konstantin Balmont
Considered to be one of the most popular poets, who believed in first inspiration and sometimes intentionally left his verse unrevised. In many regards looked upon as the antipode of Valery Bryusov. Considering its variability and diversity to be an indispensable quality of the human soul (“There is everything in the souls”), Balmont draws diverse manifestations of the human character. In his work, he paid tribute to individualism (“I hate humanity / / I run away from him in a hurry / / My only fatherland / / My desert soul”). However, this was nothing more than outrageous and, to a certain extent, a fleeting tribute to fashion, because all his work, with such rare exceptions, is imbued with ideas of kindness, attention to man and the world around him.
 Fyodor Sologub
The pessimistic Russian symbolist writer, who referred to himself as the bard of death. He was the first writer to introduce the morbid, pessimistic elements characteristic of fin de siècle literature and philosophy into Russian prose. His most famous novel, The Petty Demon (1905), was an attempt to create a living portrait of the concept known in Russian as poshlost' (an idea whose meaning lies somewhere between evil, trashy and banality or kitsch). His next large prose work, A Created Legend (a trilogy consisting of Drops of Blood, Queen Ortruda, and Smoke and Ash), contained many of the same characteristics but presented a considerably more positive and hopeful view of the world.
 Alexei Remizov
A Russian symbolist who wrote mainly prose. Drawing on medieval Russian literature, he grotesquely combined dreams, reality and pure whimsy in his works.

Though the reputations of many of these writers had faded by the mid-20th century, the influence of the symbolist movement was nonetheless profound. This was especially true in the case of Innokenty Annensky, whose definitive collection of verse, Cypress Box, was published posthumously (1909). Sometimes cited as a Slavic counterpart to the accursed poets, Annensky managed to render into Russian the essential intonations of Baudelaire and Verlaine, while the subtle music, ominous allusions, arcane vocabulary, and the spell of minutely changing colours and odours in his poetry were all his own. His influence on the acmeist school of Russian poetry (Akhmatova, Gumilyov, Mandelshtam) was paramount.

Younger generation: Ivanov, Blok, Bely 

Russian symbolism really flourished in the first decade of the 20th century. Many new talents began to publish verse written in the symbolist vein. These writers were especially indebted to the philosopher Vladimir Solovyov. The scholar Vyacheslav Ivanov, whose interests lay in ancient poetry, returned from Italy to establish a Dionysian club in St Petersburg. His self-proclaimed principle was to engraft "archaic Miltonic diction" to Russian poetry. Maximilian Voloshin, known best for his poetry about the Russian revolution, opened a poetic salon at his villa in the Crimea. Jurgis Baltrušaitis, a close friend of Alexander Scriabin and whose poetry is characterized by mystical philosophy and mesmerizing sounds, was active in Lithuania.

Of the new generation, two young poets, Alexander Blok and Andrei Bely, became the most renowned of the entire Russian symbolist movement. Alexander Blok is widely considered to be one of the leading Russian poets of the twentieth century. He was often compared with Alexander Pushkin, and the whole Silver Age of Russian Poetry was sometimes styled the "Age of Blok." His early verse is impeccably musical and rich in sound. Later, he sought to introduce daring rhythmic patterns and uneven beats into his poetry. His mature poems are often based on the conflict between the Platonic vision of ideal beauty and the disappointing reality of foul industrial outskirts. They are often characterized by an idiosyncratic use of color and spelling to express meaning.  One of Blok's most famous and controversial poems was "The Twelve," which described the march of twelve Bolshevik soldiers through the streets of revolutionary Petrograd in pseudo-religious terms.

Andrei Bely strove to forge a unity of prose, poetry, and music in much of his literature, as evidenced by the title of one of his early works, Symphonies in Prose. However, his fame rests primarily on post-symbolist works such as celebrated modernist novel Petersburg (1911-1913), a philosophical and spiritual work featuring a highly unorthodox narrative style, fleeting allusions and distinctive rhythmic experimentation.  Vladimir Nabokov placed it second in his list of the greatest novels of the twentieth century after James Joyce's Ulysses.  Other works worthy of mention include the highly influential theoretical book of essays Symbolism (1910), which was instrumental in redefining the goals of the symbolist movement, and the novel Kotik Letaev (1914-1916), which traces the first glimpses of consciousness in a new-born baby.

The city of St. Petersburg itself became one of the major symbols utilized by the second generation of Russian symbolists. Blok's verses on the imperial capital bring to life an impressionistic picture of the "city of a thousand illusions" and as a doomed world full of merchants and bourgeois figures. Various elemental forces (such as sunrises and sunsets, light and darkness, lightning and fire) assume apocalyptic qualities, serving as portents of a cataclysmic event that would change the earth and humanity forever. The Scythians and Mongols were often found in the works of these poets, serving as symbols of future catastrophic wars. Due to the eschatological tendency inherent in the Russian symbolist movement, many of them—including Blok, Bely, and Bryusov—accepted the Russian Revolution as the next evolutionary step in their nation's history.

Decline of the movement
Russian symbolism had begun to lose its momentum in literature by the 1920s as many younger poets were drawn to the acmeist movement, which distanced itself from excesses of symbolism, or joined the futurists, an iconoclastic group which sought to recreate art entirely, eschewing all aesthetic conventions.

Despite intense disapproval by the Soviet State, however, Symbolism continued to be an influence on poets like Boris Pasternak. In the Literary Gazette of September 9, 1958, the critic Viktor Pertsov denounced, "the decadent religious poetry of Pasternak, which reeks of mothballs from the Symbolist suitcase of 1908-10 manufacture."

Visual arts
    

Probably the most important Russian symbolist painter was Mikhail Vrubel, who achieved fame with a large mosaic-like canvas The Demon Seated (1890) and went mad while working on the dynamic and sinister The Demon Downcast (1902).        

Other symbolist painters associated with the World of Art magazine were Victor Borisov-Musatov and Kuzma Petrov-Vodkin, followers of Puvis de Chavannes; Mikhail Nesterov, who painted religious subjects from medieval Russian history; Mstislav Dobuzhinsky, with his "urbanistic phantasms", and Nicholas Roerich, whose paintings have been described as hermetic, or esoteric. The tradition of Russian symbolism in the late Soviet period was renewed by Konstantin Vasilyev, whose style was greatly influenced by the Russian Neo-romantic painter Viktor Vasnetsov, as well as Mikhail Nesterov and Nicholas Roerich.                                                                                                                                                                                                                                                                                                                                                                                                                                                                                                                                                                                                                                                                                                                                                                                                                                                                                                                                                                                                                                                                                                                                                                                                                                                                                                                                                                                                                                                                                                                                                                                                                                                                                                                                                                                                                                                                                                                                                                                                                                                                                                                                                                                                                                                                                                                                                                                                                                                                                                                                                                                                                                                                                                                                                                                                                                                                                                                                                                                                                                                                                                                                                                                                                                                                                                                                                                                                                                                                                                                                                                                                                                                                                                                                                                                                                                                                                                                                                                                                                                                                                                                                                                                                                                                                                                                                                                                                                                                                                                                                                                                                                                                                                                                                                                                                                                                                                                                                                                                                                                                                                                                                                                                                                                                                                                                                                                                                                                                                                                                                                                                                                                                                                                                                                                                                                                                                                                                                                                                                                                                                                                                                                                                                                                                                                                                                                                                                                                                                                                                                                                                                                                                                                                                                                                                                                                                                                                                                                                                                                                                                                                                                                                                                                                                                                                                                                                                                                                                                                                                                                                                                                                                                                                                                                                                                                                                                                                                                                                                                                                                                                                                                                                                                                                                                                                                                                                                                                                                                                                                                                                                                                                                                                                                                                                                                                                                                                                                                                                                                                                                                                                                                                                                                                                                                                                                                                                                                                                                                                                                                                                                                                                                                                                                                                                                                                                                                                                                                                                                                                                                                                                                                                                                                                                                                                                                                                                                                                                                                                                                                                                                                                                                                                                                                                                                                                                                                                                                                                                                                                                                                                                                                                                                                                                                                                                                                                                                                                                                                                                                                                                                                                                                                                                                                                                                                                                                                                                                                                                                                                                                                                                                                                                                                                                                                                                                                                                                                                                                                                                                                                                                                                                                                                                                                                                                                                                                                                                                                                                                                                                                                                                                                                                                                                                                                                                                                                                                                                                                                                                                                                                                                                                                                                                                                                                                                                                                                                                                                                                                                                                                                                                                                                                                                                                                                                                                                                                                                                                                                                                                                                                                                                                                                                                                                                                                                                                                                                                                                                                                                                                                                                                                                                                                                                                                                                                                                                                                                                                                                                                                                                                                                                                                                                                                                                

.

Music and theatre

The foremost symbolist composer was Alexander Scriabin who in his First Symphony praised art as a kind of religion. Le Divin Poème (1902-1904) sought to express "the evolution of the human spirit from pantheism to unity with the universe." Prométhée (1910), given in 1915 in New York City, was accompanied by elaborately selected colour projections on a screen. In Scriabin's synthetic performances music, poetry, dancing, colours, and scents were used so as to bring about "supreme, final ecstasy." Andrey Bely and Wassily Kandinsky articulated similar ideas on the "stage fusion of all arts."
As to more traditional theatre, Paul Schmidt an influential translator, has written that The Cherry Orchard and some other late plays of Anton Chekhov show the influence of the Symbolist movement. Their first production by Constantin Stanislavski was as realistic as possible. Stanislavski collaborated with the English theatre practitioner Edward Gordon Craig on a significant production of Hamlet in 1911–12, which experimented with symbolist monodrama as a basis for its staging. Two years later, Stanislavski won international acclaim when he staged Maurice Maeterlinck's The Blue Bird in the Moscow Art Theatre.

Nikolai Evreinov was one of a number of writers who developed a symbolist theory of theatre. Evreinov insisted that everything around us is "theatre" and that nature is full of theatrical conventions, for example, desert flowers mimicking stones, mice feigning death in order to escape cats' claws, and the complicated dances of some birds. Theatre, for Evreinov, was a universal symbol of existence.

References

Bibliography
Friedman, Julia. Beyond Symbolism and Surrealism: Alexei Remizov's Synthetic Art, Northwestern University Press, 2010.  (Trade Cloth)

 
Russian art movements
Russian literary movements
Russian
Russian symbolism